X-Man is a Marvel Comics superhero. 

X-Man may also refer to: 
X-Man, a member of the X-Men
X-Man (TV series), a South Korean game show
Xavier Carter (born 1985), nicknamed X-Man, American track and field athlete
Xavier McDaniel (born 1963), nicknamed "the X-Man," American basketball player
Xavier Nady (born 1978), nicknamed X-Man, American baseball player
Xander Bogaerts (born 1992) nicknamed X-Man, Aruban baseball player
X-Man (video game)
Xman, a 1987 novel by Michael Brodsky
Ken Carson (rapper) (born 2000) nicknamed X-Man, American rapper

See also
X-Men (disambiguation)